Birth of a New Man (Spanish: Nacimiento de un Hombre Nuevo), popularly known as el huevo de Colón ("the Columbus' egg"), is a monument in Seville, Spain. It is a work by Zurab Tsereteli, consisting of a colossal statue representing Christopher Columbus partially enfolded by an egg-like shell.

It was a gift from the city of Moscow to Seville on the occasion of the 500th anniversary of the arrival of Columbus in the Caribbean in 1492.

See also 
 Birth of the New World

References 

Colossal statues in Spain
Monuments and memorials in Andalusia
Outdoor sculptures in Andalusia
Sculptures of men in Spain
Seville
Statues of Christopher Columbus
Sculptures by Zurab Tsereteli
Monuments and memorials to Christopher Columbus